The Dangsan Railway Bridge is a railway bridge that crosses the Han River in Seoul. It is used exclusively by Seoul Subway Line 2. Immediately on the south side of the bridge is Dangsan Station in Yeongdeungpo-gu, which is on an elevated platform. Hapjeong Station, a subterranean station in Mapo-gu, is located approximately 600 meters north of where the bridge makes landfall.

Following the Seongsu Bridge disaster, every bridge in Seoul was re-examined for safety and it was decided that Dangsan Bridge should be taken down and rebuilt. Amid considerable controversy, this bridge was closed for reconstruction on December 31, 1996. The reconstruction finished on November 22, 1999.

See also
List of Han River bridges
Seongsu Bridge

References

Bridges in Seoul
Railway bridges in South Korea
Bridges over the Han River (Korea)
Rapid transit bridges
Seoul Subway Line 2